Lulu Popplewell is an English comedian and actress.

She was a finalist in the Leicester Square New Comedian Of the Year Award and the Chortle Student Comedy Award 2018.

She is the daughter of Lord Justice Andrew Popplewell and Debra Lomas, a dermatologist. She is the younger sister of actress Anna Popplewell and the older sister of Freddie Popplewell, the niece of former cricketer Nigel Popplewell and the granddaughter of retired judge Oliver Popplewell.

Popplewell was originally known for her role as Daisy in the 2003 film Love Actually. On radio she played the part of Lyra Belacqua in BBC Radio 4's 2003 dramatisation of Philip Pullman's His Dark Materials trilogy.

Filmography

References

External links
 
 Lulu Popplewell on Myspace

Year of birth missing (living people)
Living people
Actresses from London
21st-century English comedians
English women comedians
English film actresses
English radio actresses
21st-century English actresses
Comedians from London